Carl Benedikt Frey is a Swedish-German economist and economic historian. He is Oxford Martin Citi Fellow at Oxford University where he directs the programme on the Future of Work at the Oxford Martin School.

Career 
After studying economics, history and management at Lund University, Frey completed his PhD at the Max Planck Institute for Innovation and Competition in 2011. He subsequently joined the Oxford Martin School where he founded the programme on the Future of Work with support from Citigroup. Between 2012 and 2014, he was teaching at the Department of Economic History at Lund University.

In 2012, Frey became an Economics Associate of Nuffield College and Senior Fellow at the Institute for New Economic Thinking, both University of Oxford. He remains a Senior Fellow of the Department of Economic History at Lund University, and a Fellow of the Royal Society for the Encouragement of Arts, Manufactures and Commerce (RSA). In 2019, he joined the World Economic Forum's Global Future Council on the New Economic Agenda, as well as the Bretton Woods Committee.  And in 2020, he became a member of the Global Partnership on Artificial Intelligence (GPAI) – a multistakeholder initiative to guide the responsible development and use of AI, hosted by the OECD.

Research 
In 2013, Frey, together with Oxford professor Michael Osborne, co-authored “The Future of Employment: How Susceptible Are Jobs to Computerization”, estimating that 47% of jobs are at risk of automation. With over 10,000 citations according to Google Scholar, the study’s methodology has been used by President Barack Obama's Council of Economic Advisors, the Bank of England, the World Bank, as well as a popular risk-prediction tool by the BBC. In 2019, it was debated on HBO's Last Week Tonight with John Oliver.

The Frey and Osborne study has often been taken to imply an employment apocalypse. For example, Yuval Noah Harari, Kai-Fu Lee, Richard David Precht and Martin Ford have argued that societies need to prepare for a jobless future, citing Frey and Osborne. However, this is not what the study actually suggests. In an interview with Martin Wolf, Frey made clear that their study should not be taken to mean the end of work.

In a recent retrospective on the ensuing debate, The Economist referred to him as “an accidental doom-monger” and pointed out that Frey is in fact much more optimistic than he had been made out to be.

The economics bibliographic database IDEAS/RePEc ranks him among the top 5% of economists under a number of criteria.

The Technology Trap 
In 2019, Frey published The Technology Trap: Capital, Labor, and Power in the Age of Automation. Comparing the British Industrial Revolution to the Computer Revolution, he argues that the long-run benefits of both events have been immense and indisputable. However, many of those who lived through these massive economic upheavals were not among its main beneficiaries. The Luddites, who smashed machines in the nineteenth century were right in thinking that modern industry reduced their utility.

Frey goes on to argue that the reason why the Industrial Revolution first happened in Britain was that governments there were the first to side with inventors and industrialists, and vigorously repressed any worker resistance to mechanisation. The army that was sent out against the Luddites, for example, was larger than the army Wellington took against Napoleon in the Peninsula War of 1808. In continental Europe (and in China), in contrast, worker resistance was successful, which Frey suggests helps explain why economic growth there was slow to take off. Luddite efforts to avoid the short-term disruption associated with a new technology, can end up denying access to its long-term benefits—something Frey calls a “technology trap”.

Frey also argues that much of today’s political and economic polarisation has to do with technology. The central concern that runs through The Technology Trap is that, unless we are very careful, our latest technological revolution may well turn out to be a tumultuous rerun of the Industrial Revolution, with dire social and political consequences. “The message of this book is that we have been here before,” writes Frey. An opinion poll by the Pew Research Centre survey in 2017 found that 85 per cent of US respondents favoured policies to restrict the rise of the robots.

Reviews 
The book has been lauded by several publications such as The Economist and The Guardian, and was selected as a Financial Times Best Books of the Year in 2019.

Economic historians have also praised it. Niall Ferguson called it "of vital importance to voters and policy-makers alike.” Writing in Project Syndicate, Jane Humphries and Benjamin Schneider called it "a historical odyssey." In a review in The Journal of Economic History, Joel Mokyr of Northwestern University called it “an erudite, thoughtful [and] important book that economic historians should read.” However, he also called into question how much economists can learn about the present by studying the history of technology.

In another review published by the Economic History Association, Alexander J. Field wrote that "Frey has written an important and timely book... Many works of this nature, which attempt to cover centuries, indeed millennia of economic history, as well as look into the future, end up being superficial and often error-ridden. On these dimensions the book is largely if not entirely an exception. A great deal of effort, thought, and scholarship went into its writing, and it shows. There is much food for thought here.”

References

Year of birth missing (living people)
Living people
Economic historians
Swedish economists